Eric King may refer to:

 Eric King (American football) (born 1982), NFL cornerback with the Detroit Lions
 Eric King (baseball) (born 1964), former pitcher with the Detroit Tigers
 Erik King (born 1963), American actor